Hynčice may refer to places in the Czech Republic:

Hynčice (Náchod District), a municipality and village in the Hradec Králové Region
Hynčice (Vražné), a village and part of Vražné in the Moravian-Silesian Region
Hynčice, a village and part of Město Albrechtice in the Moravian-Silesian Region
Hynčice nad Moravou, a village and part of Hanušovice in the Olomouc Region

See also 
 Heinzendorf (disambiguation)